Richard Zeckwer (April 30, 1850 – December 31, 1922) was a composer and music teacher.

Biography
He was born in Stendal and studied at the Felix Mendelssohn College of Music and Theatre, where he studied piano under Ignaz Moscheles  before moving to Philadelphia, where he died. His compositions include The Bride of Messina overture and The Festival Overture. From 1876 to 1917 he was the director of the Philadelphia Musical Academy in Philadelphia, Pennsylvania.

Zeckwer's son, Camille, was also a composer and music educator in Philadelphia.

References

External links 
 

1850 births
1922 deaths
American male composers
American composers
Musicians from Philadelphia
German emigrants to the United States
People from Stendal